CSS Virginia was the first steam-powered ironclad warship built by the Confederate States Navy during the first year of the American Civil War; she was constructed as a casemate ironclad using the razéed (cut down) original lower hull and engines of the scuttled steam frigate . Virginia was one of the participants in the Battle of Hampton Roads, opposing the Union's  in March 1862. The battle is chiefly significant in naval history as the first battle between ironclads.

USS Merrimack becomes CSS Virginia
When the Commonwealth of Virginia seceded from the Union in 1861, one of the important federal military bases threatened was Gosport Navy Yard (now Norfolk Naval Shipyard) in Portsmouth, Virginia. Accordingly, orders were sent to destroy the base rather than allow it to fall into Confederate hands. On the afternoon of 17 April, the day Virginia seceded, Engineer in Chief B. F. Isherwood managed to get the frigate's engines lit. However, the previous night secessionists had sunk light boats between Craney Island and Sewell's Point, blocking the channel. On 20 April, before evacuating the Navy Yard, the U. S. Navy burned Merrimack to the waterline and sank her to preclude capture.  When the Confederate government took possession of the fully provisioned yard, the base's new commander, Flag Officer French Forrest, contracted on May 18 to salvage the wreck of the frigate. This was completed by May 30, and she was towed into the shipyard's only dry dock (today known as Drydock Number One), where the burned structures were removed.

The wreck was surveyed and her lower hull and machinery were discovered to be undamaged. Stephen Mallory, Secretary of the Navy decided to convert Merrimack into an ironclad, since she was the only large ship with intact engines available in the Chesapeake Bay area. Preliminary sketch designs were submitted by Lieutenants John Mercer Brooke and John L. Porter, each of whom envisaged the ship as a casemate ironclad. Brooke's general design showed the bow and stern portions submerged, and his design was the one finally selected. The detailed design work would be completed by Porter, who was a trained naval constructor. Porter had overall responsibility for the conversion, but Brooke was responsible for her iron plate and heavy ordnance, while William P. Williamson, Chief Engineer of the Navy, was responsible for the ship's machinery.

Reconstruction as an ironclad

The hull's burned timbers were cut down past the vessel's original waterline, leaving just enough clearance to accommodate her large, twin-bladed screw propeller. A new fantail and armored casemate were built atop a new main deck, and a v-shaped  (bulwark) was added to her bow, which attached to the armored casemate. This forward and aft main deck and fantail were designed to stay submerged and were covered in  iron plate, built up in two layers.

From reports in Northern newspapers, Virginias designers were aware of the Union plans to build an ironclad and assumed their similar ordnance would be unable to do much serious damage to such a ship. It was decided to equip their ironclad with a ram, an anachronism on a 19th century warship. Merrimack'''s steam engines, now part of Virginia, were in poor working order; they had been slated for replacement when the decision was made to abandon the Norfolk naval yard. The salty Elizabeth River water and the addition of tons of iron armor and pig iron ballast, added to the hull's unused spaces for needed stability after her initial refloat, and to submerge her unarmored lower levels, only added to her engines' propulsion issues.

The ironclad's casemate had 14 gun ports, three each in the bow and stern, one firing directly along the ship's centerline, the two others angled at 45° from the center line; these six bow and stern gun ports had exterior iron shutters installed to protect their cannon. There were four gun ports on each broadside; their protective iron shutters remained uninstalled during both days of the Battle of Hampton Roads. Virginias battery consisted of four muzzle-loading single-banded Brooke rifles and six smoothbore  Dahlgren guns salvaged from the old Merrimack. Two of the rifles, the bow and stern pivot guns, were  caliber and weighed  each. They fired a  shell. Both amidship Dahlgrens nearest the boiler furnaces were fitted-out to fire heated shot. On her upper casemate deck were positioned two anti-boarding/personnel 12-pounder Howitzers.Virginias commanding officer, Flag Officer Franklin Buchanan, arrived to take command only a few days before her first sortie; the ironclad was placed in commission and equipped by her executive officer, Lieutenant Catesby ap Roger Jones.

Battle of Hampton Roads

The Battle of Hampton Roads began on March 8, 1862, when Virginia engaged the blockading Union fleet.

The first Union ship to be engaged by Virginia was the all-wood, sail-powered , which was first crippled during a furious cannon exchange, and then rammed in her forward starboard bow by Virginia. As Cumberland began to sink, the port side half of Virginias iron ram was broken off, causing a bow leak in the ironclad. Seeing what had happened to Cumberland, the captain of  ordered his frigate into shallower water, where she soon grounded. Congress and Virginia traded cannon fire for an hour, after which the badly-damaged Congress finally surrendered. While the surviving crewmen of Congress were being ferried off the ship, a Union battery on the north shore opened fire on Virginia. Outraged at such a breach of war protocol, in retaliation Virginias now angry captain, Commodore Franklin Buchanan, gave the order to open fire with hot-shot on the surrendered Congress as he rushed to Virginias exposed upper casemate deck, where he was injured by enemy rifle fire. Congress, now set ablaze by the retaliatory shelling, burned for many hours into the night, a symbol of Confederate naval power and a costly wake-up call for the all-wood Union blockading squadron.Virginia did not emerge from the battle unscathed, however. Her hanging port side anchor was lost after ramming Cumberland; the bow was leaking from the loss of the ram's port side half; shot from Cumberland, Congress, and the shore-based Union batteries had riddled her smokestack, reducing her boilers' draft and already slow speed; two of her broadside cannon (without shutters) were put out of commission by shell hits; a number of her armor plates had been loosened; both of Virginias  cutters had been shot away, as had both 12 pounder anti-boarding/anti-personnel howitzers, most of the deck stanchions, railings, and both flagstaffs. However, because of the ironclad's  draft (fully loaded), she was unable to get close enough to do any significant damage. It being late in the day, Virginia retired from the conflict with the expectation of returning the next day and completing the destruction of the remaining Union blockaders.

Later that night,  arrived at Union-held Fort Monroe. She had been rushed to Hampton Roads, still not quite complete, all the way from the Brooklyn Navy Yard, in hopes of defending the force of wooden ships and preventing "the rebel monster" from further threatening the Union's blockading fleet and nearby cities, like Washington, D.C. While under tow, she nearly foundered twice during heavy storms on her voyage south, arriving in Hampton Roads by the bright firelight from the still-burning triumph of Virginias first day of handiwork.

The next day, on March 9, 1862, the world's first battle between ironclads took place. The smaller, nimbler, and faster Monitor was able to outmaneuver the larger, slower Virginia, but neither ship proved able to do any severe damage to the other, despite numerous shell hits by both combatants, many fired at virtually point-blank range. Monitor had a much lower freeboard and only its single, rotating, two-cannon gun turret and forward pilothouse sitting above her deck, and thus was much harder to hit with Virginias heavy cannon. After hours of shell exchanges, Monitor finally retreated into shallower water after a direct shell hit to her armored pilothouse forced her away from the conflict to assess the damage. The captain of the Monitor, Lieutenant John L. Worden, had taken a direct gunpowder explosion to his face and eyes, blinding him, while looking through the pilothouse's narrow, horizontal viewing slits. Monitor remained in the shallows, but as it was late in the day, Virginia steamed for her home port, the battle ending without a clear victor: The captain of Virginia that day, Lieutenant Catesby ap Roger Jones, received advice from his pilots to depart over the sandbar toward Norfolk until the next day. Lieutenant Jones wanted to continue the fight, but the pilots emphasized that the Virginia had "nearly three miles to run to the bar" and that she could not remain and "take the ground on a falling tide." To prevent running aground, Lieutenant Jones reluctantly moved the ironclad back toward port. Virginia retired to the Gosport Naval Yard at Portsmouth, Virginia, and remained in drydock for repairs until April 4, 1862.

In the following month, the crew of Virginia were unsuccessful in their attempts to break the Union blockade. Virginia made several sorties back over to Hampton Roads hoping to draw Monitor into battle. Monitor, however, was under strict orders not to re-engage; the two combatants would never battle again.

On April 11, the Confederate Navy sent Lieutenant Joseph Nicholson Barney, in command of the paddle side-wheeler , along with Virginia and five other ships in full view of the Union squadron, enticing them to fight. When it became clear that Union Navy ships were unwilling to fight, the CS Navy squadron moved in and captured three merchant ships, the brigs Marcus and Sabout and the schooner Catherine T. Dix.

By late April, the new Union ironclads USRC E. A. Stevens and  had also joined the blockade. On May 8, 1862, Virginia and the James River Squadron ventured out when the Union ships began shelling the Confederate fortifications near Norfolk, but the Union ships retired under the shore batteries on the north side of the James River and on Rip Raps island.

Destruction of CSS Virginia

On May 10, 1862, advancing Union troops occupied Norfolk. Since Virginia was now a steam-powered heavy battery and no longer an ocean-going cruiser, her pilots judged her not seaworthy enough to enter the Atlantic, even if she were able to pass the Union blockade. Virginia was also unable to retreat further up the James River due to her deep  draft (fully loaded). In an attempt to reduce it, supplies and coal were dumped overboard, even though this exposed the ironclad's unarmored lower hull; this was still not enough to make a difference. Without a home port and no place to go, Virginias new captain, flag officer Josiah Tattnall III, reluctantly ordered her destruction in order to keep the ironclad from being captured. This task fell to Lieutenant Jones, the last man to leave Virginia after her cannons had been safely removed and carried to the Confederate Marine Corps base and fortifications at Drewry's Bluff. Early on the morning of May 11, 1862, off Craney Island, fire and powder trails reached the ironclads magazine and she was destroyed by a great explosion. What remained of the ship settled to the bottom of the harbor. Only a few remnants of Virginia have been recovered for preservation in museums; reports from the era indicate that her wreck was heavily salvaged following the war.Monitor was lost on December 31 of the same year, when the vessel was swamped by high waves in a violent storm while under tow by the tug USS Rhode Island off Cape Hatteras, North Carolina. Sixteen of her 62-member crew were either lost overboard or went down with the ironclad, while many others were saved by lifeboats sent from Rhode Island. Her upside-down turret was raised from beneath her deep, capsized wreck years later with the remains of two of her crew still aboard; they were later buried with full military honors on March 8, 2013, at Arlington National Cemetery in Washington, D.C.

Historical names: Merrimack, Virginia, Merrimac
Although the Confederacy renamed the ship, she is still frequently referred to by her Union name. When she was first commissioned into the United States Navy in 1856, her name was Merrimack, with the K; the name was derived from the Merrimack River near where she was built. She was the second ship of the U. S. Navy to be named for the Merrimack River, which is formed by the confluence of the Pemigewasset and Winnipesaukee rivers at Franklin, New Hampshire. The Merrimack flows south across New Hampshire, then eastward across northeastern Massachusetts before finally emptying in the Atlantic at Newburyport, Massachusetts.

After raising, restoring, and outfitting as an ironclad warship, the Confederacy bestowed on her the name Virginia. Nonetheless, the Union continued to refer to the Confederate ironclad by either its original name, Merrimack, or by the nickname "The Rebel Monster". In the aftermath of the Battle of Hampton Roads, the names Virginia and Merrimack were used interchangeably by both sides, as attested to by various newspapers and correspondence of the day. Navy reports and pre-1900 historians frequently misspelled the name as "Merrimac", which was actually an unrelated ship, hence "the Battle of the Monitor and the Merrimac". Both spellings are still in use in the Hampton Roads area.

Memorial, heritage
A large exhibit at the Jamestown Exposition held in 1907 at Sewell's Point was the "Battle of the Merrimac and Monitor," a large diorama that was housed in a special building.
A small community in Montgomery County, Virginia, near where the coal burned by the Confederate ironclad was mined, is now known as Merrimac.
The October 8, 1867, issue of the Norfolk Virginian newspaper carried a prominent classified advertisement in the paper's "Private Sales" section for the salvaged iron ram of CSS Virginia. The ad states:
A RELIC OF WAR FOR SALE: The undersigned has had several offers for the IRON PROW! of the first iron-clad ever built, the celebrated Ram and Iron Clad Virginia, formerly the Merrimac. This immense RELIC WEIGHS 1,340 POUNDS, wrought iron, and as a sovereign of the war, and an object of interest as a revolution in naval warfare, would suit a Museum, State Institute, or some great public resort. Those desiring to purchase will please address D. A. UNDERDOWN, Wrecker, care of Virginian Office, Norfolk, Va.
It is unclear from the above whether this was the first iron ram that broke off and lodged in the starboard bow of the sinking USS Cumberland, during the first day of the Battle of Hampton Roads, or was the second iron ram affixed to Virginias bow at the time she was run aground and destroyed to avoid capture by Union forces; no further mention has been found concerning the final disposition of this historic artifact.

Other pieces of Virginia did survive and are on display at the Mariners' Museum in Newport News and the American Civil War Museum in Richmond, where one of her anchors resides on its front lawn.
In 1907, an armor plate from the ship was melted down and used in the casting of the Pokahuntas Bell for the Jamestown Exposition.
Starting around 1883, numerous souvenirs, made from recently salvaged iron and wood raised from Virginias sunken hulk, found a ready and willing market among eastern seaboard residents who remembered the historic first battle between ironclads. Various tokens, medals, medalets, sectional watch fobs, and other similar metal keepsakes are known to have been struck by private mints in limited quantities. Known examples still exist today, being held in both public and private collections, rarely coming up for public auction. Nine examples made from Virginias iron and copper can be found cataloged in great detail, with front and back photos, in David Schenkman's 1979 numismatic booklet listed in the Reference section (below).
The name of the Monitor-Merrimac Memorial Bridge-Tunnel, built in Hampton Roads in the general vicinity of the famous engagement, with both Virginia and federal funds, also reflects the more recent version.

See also

 Bibliography of American Civil War naval history

Notes

References
 

Nelson, James L. (2004). The Reign of Iron: The Story of the First Battling Ironclads, the Monitor and the Merrimack , HarperCollins Publishers, New York, .
 
Park, Carl D., (2007) Ironclad Down, USS Merrimack-CSS Virginia, From Construction to Destruction, Annapolis, Maryland: Naval Institute Press. .

Quarstein, John V. (2000). C.S.S. Virginia, Mistress of Hampton Roads, self-published for the Virginia Civil War Battles and Leaders Series by H. E. Howard, Inc. 

Schenkman, David, (1979). Tokens & Medals Commemorating the Battle Between the Monitor and Merrimac  (sic), Hampton, Virginia, 28-page booklet (the second in a series of Special Articles on the Numismatics of The Commonwealth of Virginia), Virginia Numismatic Association. No ISSN or ISBN.
 
Smith, Gene A., (1998). Iron and Heavy Guns, Duel Between the Monitor and Merrimac  (sic), Abilene, Texas, McWhiney Foundation Press, .
 

Further reading
  82 pages.
 Baxter, James Phinney (1968). The Introduction of the Ironclad Warship, Archon Books, p. 398.
Besse, Sumner B., C. S. Ironclad Virginia and U. S. Ironclad Monitor, Newport News, Virginia, The Mariner's Museum, 1978. .
DeKay, James, (1997) Monitor'', Ballantine Books, New York, NY.
 
 .

External links

Library of Virginia
Virginia Historical Society
Museum of the Confederacy in Richmond, Virginia
Website devoted to the CSS Virginia
Hampton Roads Visitor Guide
 USS Monitor Center and Exhibit , Newport News, Virginia
 Mariner's Museum, Newport News, Virginia
 Hampton Roads Naval Museum 
 Civil War Naval History
 Fort Wool History
 Roads to the Future – I-664 Monitor-Merrimac Memorial Bridge Tunnel

Ironclad warships of the Confederate States Navy
Shipwrecks of the Virginia coast
Ships built in Newport News, Virginia
Battle of Hampton Roads
1862 ships
Maritime incidents in May 1862
Shipwrecks of the American Civil War
Scuttled vessels
Naval magazine explosions